VTV Gujarati is a 24-hour regional news channel in Gujarat. The channel is owned by Gujarat News Broadcasters Pvt. Ltd.

The company is promoted by Sambhav media. The channel enjoys major popularity in rural areas of the state. The headquarters is located at Sambhaav House, Opp. Judges Bunglow, Bodakdev in Ahmedabad, Gujarat, India. The news channel has an independent web portal VTVGujarati.com which is jointly owned by Sambhav Media and Nascent Info Technologies.

History
VTV Gujarati emerged from Sambhav media, a media group which was founded by Indian author and journalist Bhoopat Vadodaria in 1986. [ref]

Mahamanthan
Mahamanthan was one of the most popular prime time news show of VTV-Gujarati hosted by its then channel head, Isudan Gadhvi. It was started in 2015 by Isudan who hosted it until 2021. It presented discussion among the panelists about various issues and also interacted with the public about their views. It became very popular in Gujarat, especially rural areas.

Web Portal
On 25 January 2019, Sambhav Media collaborated with Nascent Info Technologies to create an online news portal. The platform is named as VTVGujarati.com. This joint business, legally known as LLP, carries out publishing national and international news, business news and sports news (ref). (ref)

References

Television channels and stations established in 2010
Hindi-language television stations
Television stations in India
Gujarati-language television channels in India
Television stations in Ahmedabad
24-hour television news channels in India